The Martinsville Astros were a short season minor league baseball team located in Martinsville, Virginia.  The team was affiliated with the Houston Astros and played in the Appalachian League from 1999 to 2003.  Martinsville was also home to the Martinsville Phillies (1988-1998), Martinsville A's (1945-1949) and the Martinsville Manufacturers (1934-1941).

Ballpark
Beginning in 1988, the Martinsville home stadium was Hooker Field, located at 450 Commonwealth Boulevard in Martinsville, Virginia. The facility is still in use today. Previously, the A's and Manufacturers had played at Doug English Field.

Alumni

Other Alumni

 Matt Albers (2002)

 Wandy Rodriguez (2001)

References

Defunct Appalachian League teams
Martinsville, Virginia
Defunct baseball teams in Virginia
Houston Astros minor league affiliates
1999 establishments in Virginia
2003 disestablishments in Virginia